Angélica Sofía Castro Rivera (born 30 October 1996), known professionally as Sofía Castro, is a Mexican actress. She is the daughter of Angelica Rivera and José Alberto Castro. She is the step-daughter of former president Enrique Peña Nieto.

Filmography

Television

Awards and nominations

References

External links

1996 births
Living people
Mexican child actresses
Mexican telenovela actresses
Mexican television actresses
Actresses from Mexico City
People from Mexico City
21st-century Mexican actresses